Ian MacPherson, Macpherson or McPherson may refer to:

Ian Macpherson, 1st Baron Strathcarron (1880–1937), British lawyer and politician
Ian Macpherson (novelist) (1905–1944), Scottish novelist
Ian McPherson (1920–1983), Scottish footballer
Ian MacPherson (historian) (1939–2013), Canadian historian and co-operative activist
Ian Macpherson, 3rd Baron Strathcarron (born 1949), British peer, grandson of the 1st Baron
Ian Macpherson (comedian) (born 1951), Irish comic novelist, playwright and performer
Ian McPherson (police officer) (born 1961), British police officer